Buddy Morrow (born Muni Zudekoff, aka Moe Zudekoff; February 8, 1919 – September 27, 2010) was an American trombonist and bandleader.

Career
On a scholarship at age 16, Morrow studied trombone with Ernest Horatio Clarke (1865–1947) at Juilliard from October to December 1936. During the next year he began playing trombone with Sharkey Bonano's Sharks of Rhythm, an Eddie Condon group. He then worked with Eddy Duchin, Vincent Lopez, and Artie Shaw. He became known as "Buddy Morrow" in 1938 when he joined the Tommy Dorsey band. In 1939 he performed with Paul Whiteman's Concert Orchestra for their recording of Gershwin's Concerto in F. In 1940, Morrow joined the Tony Pastor band, but this was only a short detour on his way to replacing Ray Conniff in the Bob Crosby band. Shortly thereafter, he joined the U.S. Navy, during which he recorded with Billy Butterfield, leading a ten-piece band with three trombones, accompanying Red McKenzie singing four arrangements, including "Sweet Lorraine" and "It's the Talk of the Town".

After demobilization, Morrow joined Jimmy Dorsey's band, then went into radio freelancing as a studio musician. He began conducting sessions, which introduced him to bandleading. RCA Victor sponsored him as director of his band in 1951. The band's first hit, "Night Train" by Jimmy Forrest, was a hit in rhythm and blues.

Morrow's early 1950s records such as "Rose, Rose, I Love You" and "Night Train" appeared on the Billboard magazine charts. "Night Train" reached No. 12 in the U.K. Singles Chart in March 1953. In 1959 and 1960 Morrow's Orchestra released two albums of American television theme songs: Impact and Double Impact respectively. Morrow was a member of The Tonight Show Band.

Morrow led the Tommy Dorsey Orchestra from 1977 through September 24, 2010, when he appeared with the band for the final time. Morrow died on September 27, 2010.

Awards and honors
 Lifetime Achievement Award, International Trombone Association, 2009
 Phi Mu Alpha Sinfonia music fraternity, Rho Tau chapter at Appalachian State University

Discography 
 Re-enlistment Blues (?, 1953) 
 Shall We Dance (Mercury, 1955)
 Golden Trombone (Mercury, 1956)
 Music for Dancing Feet (Wing, 1956)
 A Salute to the Fabulous Dorseys (Mercury, 1957)
 Tribute to a Sentimental Gentleman (Mercury, 1957)
 Night Train (RCA Victor, 1957)
 Dancing Tonight to Morrow (RCA Victor, 1958)
 Let's Have a Dance Party! (RCA Camden, 1958)
 Just We Two (Mercury, 1958)
 Impact (RCA Victor, 1959)
 Double Impact (RCA Victor, 1960)
 Poe For Moderns (RCA Victor, 1960)
 Night Train Goes to Hollywood (Mercury, 1962)
 New Blues Scene (United Artists, 1967)
 Revolving Bandstand (RCA, 1974)
 Big Band Series.Original Recording (Picc-a-Dilly, 1980)
 The Complete R.C.A. Victor Revolving Bandstand Sessions (RCA, 1993)
 Swing the Sinatra Way (Hindsight, 1998)

As sideman
With Count Basie
 High Voltage (MPS, 1970)
 Basie's Timing (MPS, 1972)

With the Free Design
 Kites Are Fun (Project 3 Total Sound, 1967)
 Stars/Time/Bubbles/Love (Project 3 Total Sound, 1970)

With Jackie Gleason
 Tis the Season (Capitol, 1967)
 A Taste of Brass for Lovers Only (Capitol, 1967)

With Urbie Green
 21 Trombones (Project 3 Total Sound, 1967)
 21 Trombones Rock/Blues/Jazz Volume Two (Project 3 Total Sound, 1969)
 Urbie Green's Big Beautiful Band (Project 3  Total Sound, 1974)

With Enoch Light
 Volume II (Project 3 Total Sound, 1969)
 Big Hits of the 20's (Project 3 Total Sound, 1971)
 The Big Band Sound of the Thirties (Project 3 Total Sound, 1971)
 Big Band Hits of the 30's & 40's (Project 3 Total Sound, 1971)
 1973 (Project 3 Total Sound, 1972)
 The Big Band Hits of the 40s & 50s (Project 3 Total Sound, 1973)

With Flip Phillips
 Flip Phillips Collates (Clef, 1952)
  Flip (Verve, 1961)

With Lee Wiley
 Back Home Again (Monmouth Evergreen, 1971)
 I've Got the World On a String (Ember, 1972)

With others
 Gato Barbieri, Chapter Three: Viva Emiliano Zapata (Impulse!, 1974)
 Bob Crosby, South Rampart Street Parade (Decca, 1992)
 Marty Gold, Suddenly It's Springtime (RCA Victor, 1964)
 Barry Manilow, Singin' with the Big Bands (Arista, 1994)
 Galt MacDermot, Dude (Kilmarnock, 1973)
 Van McCoy, The Disco Kid (Avco, 1975)
 Moondog, Moondog (Columbia Masterworks, 1969)
 David "Fathead" Newman, Mr. Fathead (Warner Bros., 1976)
 David Ruffin, Everything's Coming Up Love (Motown, 1976)
 Artie Shaw, Rhythm Makers (Magic 1987)
 Joe Thomas, Masada (Groove Merchant, 1975)
 Sarah Vaughan, Summertime (CBS, 1984)
 Bob Wilber & Maxine Sullivan, The Music of Hoagy Carmichael (Audiophile, 1993)

References 
 ASCAP Biographical Dictionary, Fourth edition, Compiled for the American Society of Composers, Authors and Publishers by Jaques Cattell Press, R.R. Bowker, New York (1980)
 The Big Bands, revised edition, by George T. Simon, Macmillan Publishers, New York; Collier Books (1974)
 Biographical Dictionary of Jazz, by Charles Eugene Claghorn (1911–2005), Prentice Hall, Englewood Cliffs (1982)
 Biography Index, A cumulative index to biographical material in books and magazines, Volume 2: August, 1949-August, 1952, H. W. Wilson Company, New York (1953)
 Biography Index, A cumulative index to biographical material in books and magazines, Volume 18: September, 1992-August, 1993, H. W. Wilson Company, New York (1993)
 The Complete Encyclopedia of Popular Music and Jazz, 1900-1950, three volumes, by Roger Davis Kinkle (1916–2000), Arlington House Publishers, New Rochelle (1974) (bios located in vols. 2 and 3)
 Dictionary of Pseudonyms, third edition, by Adrian Richard West Room (1933- ), McFarland & Co., Jefferson, NC (1998)
 The Encyclopedia of Popular Music, third edition, eight volumes, ed. by Colin Larkin, Grove's Dictionaries, New York (1998)
 The New Grove Dictionary of Jazz, first edition, two volumes, ed. by Barry Kernfeld, Macmillan Press, London (1988)
 The New Grove Dictionary of Jazz, ed. by Barry Kernfeld, St. Martin's Press, New York (1994)
 The New Grove Dictionary of Jazz, second ed., three volumes, ed. by Barry Kernfeld, Macmillan Press, London (2002)
 The Penguin Encyclopedia of Popular Music, ed. by Donald Clarke, Viking Press, New York (1989)
 Who's Who of Jazz: Storyville to Swing Street, by John Chilton, Chilton Book Co., Philadelphia (1972)

Inline citations

External links 
 Profile of Buddy Morrow at Spaceagepop.com
 "Still Swinging" (1994)
 Steve Voce, Buddy Morrow: Trombonist and bandleader who shot to fame with the Fifties hit "Night Train", The Independent, Sept. 30, 2010
 Daniel E. Slotnik, Buddy Morrow, Trombonist and Bandleader, Dies at 91, The New York Times, Oct 2, 2010
 Eloísa Ruano González, Buddy Morrow, Big-Band Leader, Dies at 91, Orlando Sentinel, Oct. 2, 2010

1919 births
2010 deaths
Musicians from New Haven, Connecticut
Jazz musicians from Connecticut
Musicians from New York (state)
20th-century American Jews
American jazz bandleaders
American jazz trombonists
Male trombonists
Swing trombonists
American male jazz musicians
The Tonight Show Band members
Mercury Records artists
RCA Victor artists
21st-century American Jews